Music for Player Piano is the debut studio album by Daniel Vahnke, released on June 30, 2018, by Rodentia Productions.

Track listing

Personnel
Adapted from the Music for Player Piano liner notes.

Axon Tremolo
 Daniel Vahnke – piano

Production
 Neil Wojewodzki – mastering, editing

Release history

References

External links 
 Music for Player Piano at Discogs (list of releases)
 Music for Player Piano at Bandcamp
 Music for Player Piano at iTunes

2018 debut albums
Daniel Vahnke albums